The 1960–61 Soviet Championship League season was the 15th season of the Soviet Championship League, the top level of ice hockey in the Soviet Union. Nineteen teams participated in the league, and CSKA Moscow won the championship.

First round

Group A

Group B

Final round

7th-12th place

13th-19th place

External links
Season on hockeystars.ru

Soviet
Soviet League seasons
1960–61 in Soviet ice hockey